The 1952 FA Charity Shield was the 30th FA Charity Shield, an annual football match held between the winners of the previous season's Football League and FA Cup competitions. The match was contested by Manchester United, who had won the 1951–52 Football League, and Newcastle United, who had won the 1951–52 FA Cup, at Old Trafford, Manchester, on 24 September 1952. Manchester United came back from a goal down at half-time to win the match 4–2. Their goals were scored by Jack Rowley (2), Roger Byrne and John Downie, while Vic Keeble scored both goals for Newcastle.

Match details

See also
1951–52 Football League
1951–52 FA Cup

References

1952
Charity Shield 1952
Charity Shield 1952
Comm